Hooray, It's a Boy! is a 1953 West German comedy film directed by Ernst Marischka and Georg Jacoby and starring Walter Müller, Theo Lingen, and Ingrid Lutz. It is one of several film adaptations of the 1926 play of the same name.

It was shot at the Tempelhof Studios in Berlin. The film's sets were designed by Willi Herrmann and Heinrich Weidemann.

Cast

See also
Hooray, It's a Boy! (1931 film)
It's a Boy (1933 film)
 (1961 film)

References

External links

1953 comedy films
German comedy films
West German films
Films directed by Ernst Marischka
Films directed by Georg Jacoby
Constantin Film films
Remakes of German films
German black-and-white films
Films shot at Tempelhof Studios
1950s German films